Teresa Ruiz López (born 21 December 1988) is a Mexican-American actress.

Ruiz is best known for portraying cartel queen Isabella Bautista in the first two seasons of Narcos: Mexico as well as Carmen in Father Stu. She has been awarded several Best Actress awards internationally and is a Lifetime Member of the Actors Studio.

Early life 

Teresa Ruiz was born in Santiago Matatlan, Oaxaca, Mexico and grew up in Los Angeles, California.

Actors Studio training 

In 2013, Ruiz was invited by the late Martin Landau to become a member of the Actors Studio. The Actors Studio is a membership organization of professional actors led by Al Pacino and is based in New York City and Los Angeles. Ruiz studied method acting under the instruction of Martin Landau and renowned acting coaches Greta Seacat and Sandra Seacat.

Career

Ruiz appears in the 1st and 2nd seasons of the Netflix original series Narcos: Mexico playing Isabella Bautista, a long time friend (and partner in crime) of main character Miguel Ángel Félix Gallardo.

She also played the character Nadia Basurto in the political thriller Aquí en la Tierra a co-production between Gael Garcia Bernal and Diego Luna's production company La Corriente del Golfo and Fox Networks. The 8-episode drama series written and directed by some of Mexico's most renowned filmmakers was the only Latin American title competing in the inaugural edition of Cannes Film Festival: Series.

Ruiz appeared in Gregory Nava's controversial film Bordertown alongside Jennifer Lopez and Antonio Banderas. The story was based on the murders of women in Ciudad Juárez, Chihuahua and had the endorsement of Amnesty International.

Ruiz went on to play the main character in Gerardo Tort's Round Trip (or Viaje Redondo in Spanish), for which she won several Best Actress awards including the Guadalajara's International Film Festival's Mayahuel, the Prix d'Interprétation Féminine at the Amiens International Film Festival in France and the India Catalina in Colombia; as well as Mexico's Academy Award: Ariel.

Other film works include Carlos Bolado's Tlatelolco; the film tells the story of the 1968 massacre of protesting students in Mexico's capital and Jose Luis Gutierrez-Arias' remake of the classic Spanish film Marcelino Pan y Vino. She played the Mexican Golden-Era actress and dancer Meche Barba, also known as The Mexican Venus, in the biopic Cantinflas about iconic Mexican actor Mario Moreno Cantinflas.

Ruiz co-starred in the film The Delivery next to Mickey Rourke, an action movie parody directed by Louis Leterrier and appeared in Michael Bay's The Last Ship.

Ruiz was Executive Partner of the production company Machete, which won the Caméra d'Or at the 63 Cannes film festival for the film Año Bisiesto, directed by Michael Rowe.

Theater work 

In 2014 Ruiz played the part of Veronica in The Actors Studio production of Stephen Adly Guirgis's The Motherfucker with the Hat. The play was produced by Martin Landau, Ellen Burstyn and Al Pacino and opened in Los Angeles in September 2014.

She also played young Frida Kahlo in Ofelia Medina's Cada Quien su Frida; the play had its worldwide premiere at the International Cadiz Theater Festival in Spain, then went on to tour in Cuba, Denmark, the UK, Mexico and the US.

Filmography

TV

Awards
Won 7 awards & 9 nominations:

Guadalajara International Film Festival

Amiens International Film Festival, France

Colombia International Film Festival

Mexican Academy Awards

Canacine Awards

References

External links

 
 
 

Living people
Mexican film actresses
People from Oaxaca
21st-century American actresses
Actresses from Los Angeles
American film actresses
American actresses of Mexican descent
American television actresses
Hispanic and Latino American actresses
1988 births